The 41st Cannes Film Festival was held from 11 to 23 May 1988. The Palme d'Or went to the Pelle erobreren by Bille August.

The festival opened with Le Grand Bleu, directed by Luc Besson and closed with Willow, directed by Ron Howard.

Juries

Main competition
The following people were appointed as the Jury of the 1988 feature film competition:
Ettore Scola, Italian screenwriter and director (Jury President)
Claude Berri, French director, screenwriter, producer, and actor
David Robinson, British film critic
Yelena Safonova, Soviet Russian actress
George Miller, Australian firector, producer, and screenwriter
Héctor Olivera, Argentine director, producer, and screenwriter
Nastassja Kinski, German actress
Philippe Sarde, French composer
Robby Müller, Dutch cinematographer
William Goldman, American novelist – Goldman wrote about the experience in his book Hype and Glory.

Camera d'Or
The following people were appointed as the Jury of the 1988 Camera d'Or:
Danièle Delorme (actress) (France) President
Bernard Jubard
Carlos Avellar (journalist)
Chantal Calafato (cinephile)
David Streiff (cinephile)
Ekaterina Oproiu (journalist)
Henry Chapier (critic) (France)
Jacques Champreux (director) (France)

Official selection

In competition – Feature films
The following feature films competed for the Palme d'Or:

 The Abyss (L'oeuvre au noir) by André Delvaux
 Bird by Clint Eastwood
 The Cannibals (Os Canibais) by Manoel de Oliveira
 Chocolat by Claire Denis
 El Dorado by Carlos Saura
 Drowning by Numbers by Peter Greenaway
 L'enfance de l'art by Francis Girod
 Hanussen by István Szabó
 King of the Children (Hai zi wang) by Chen Kaige
 Love and Fear (Paura e amore) by Margarethe von Trotta
 El Lute II: Tomorrow I'll be Free (El Lute II: mañana seré libre) by Vicente Aranda
 Miles from Home by Gary Sinise
 Pascali's Island by James Dearden
 The Passenger – Welcome to Germany (Der Passagier – Welcome to Germany) by Thomas Brasch
 Patty Hearst by Paul Schrader
 Pelle the Conqueror (Pelle erobreren) by Bille August
 The Navigator: A Medieval Odyssey by Vincent Ward
 A Short Film About Killing (Krótki film o zabijaniu) by Krzysztof Kieślowski
 Sur by Fernando Solanas
 A World Apart by Chris Menges
 Wuthering Heights (Arashi ga oka) by Yoshishige Yoshida

Un Certain Regard
The following films were selected for the competition of Un Certain Regard:

 Among Grey Stones (Sredi serykh kamney) by Kira Muratova
 Antarjali Jatra by Gautam Ghose
 The Harms Case (Slucaj Harms) by Slobodan D. Pesic
 Havinck by Frans Weisz
 Hôtel Terminus: The Life and Times of Klaus Barbie by Marcel Ophüls
 It's Happening Tomorrow (Domani accadrà) by Daniele Luchetti
 Katinka (Ved vejen) by Max von Sydow
 Lamento by François Dupeyron
 Lounge Chair (La méridienne) by Jean-François Amiguet
 Mapantsula by Oliver Schmitz
 The Mask (La maschera) by Fiorella Infascelli
 Natalia by Bernard Cohn
 Night Journey (Gece Yolculuğu) by Ömer Kavur
 On the Silver Globe (Na srebrnym globie) by Andrzej Żuławski
 The Raggedy Rawney by Bob Hoskins
 The Revolving Doors (Les Portes tournantes) by Francis Mankiewicz
 Rouge of the North (Yuan nu) by Fred Tan
 Sand and Blood (De sable et de sang) by Jeanne Labrune
 A Song of Air by Merilee Bennett
 Stalin's Disciples (Yaldei Stalin) by Nadav Levitan
 Time of Violence (Време на насилие) by Ludmil Staikov
 Why? (Proc?) by Karel Smyczek

Out of competition
The following films were selected to be screened out of competition.

 Le Grand Bleu by Luc Besson (Special screenings)
 The Blue Iguana by John Lafia
 Dear America: Letters Home from Vietnam by Bill Couturié (Special screenings)
 Histoires du cinéma by Jean-Luc Godard (Special screenings)
 The Milagro Beanfield War by Robert Redford
 Willow by Ron Howard

Short film competition
The following short films competed for the Palme d'Or du court métrage:

 Ab Ovo / Homoknyomok (Traces of Sand) by Ferenc Cako
 Bukpytacy (Fioritures) by Gary Bardine
 Cat & Mousse by David Lawson
 Chet's Romance by Bertrand Fevre
 Les Dômes du Plaisir by Maggie Fooke
 Out of Town by Norman Hull
 Pas-ta-shoot-ah by Maurizio Forestieri
 Pleasure Domes by Maggie Fooke
 Sculpture Physique by Yann Piquer, Jean Marie Maddeddu
 Super Freak by Gisela Ekholm, Per Ekholm

Parallel sections

International Critics' Week
The following feature films were screened for the 27th International Critics' Week (27e Semaine de la Critique):

Feature film competition

 Begurebis gadaprena by Temür Babluani (Soviet Union)
 Full Moon (Dolunay) by Sahin Kaygun (Turkey)
 Tokyo Pop by Fran Rubel Kuzui (USA)
 The Well (Jing) by Yalin Li (China)
 Testament by John Akomfrah (United Kingdom)
 Portrait of a Life (Ekti Jiban) by Raja Mitra (India)
 My Dear Subject (Mon cher sujet) by Anne-Marie Miéville (France, Switzerland)

Short film competition

 La face cachée de la lune by Yvon Marciano (France)
 Metropolis Apocalypse by Jon Jacobs (United Kingdom) 
 Artisten (The Artist) by Jonas Grimas (Sweden)
 Klatka (The cage) by Olaf Olszewski (Poland)
 Cidadao Jatoba (Citizen Jatoba) by Maria Luiza Aboïm (Brazil)
 Blues Black and White by Markus Imboden (Switzerland)

Directors' Fortnight
The following feature films were screened for the 1988 Directors' Fortnight (Quinzaine des Réalizateurs):

Amerika, Terra Incognita by Diego Risquez
Daughter of the Nile (Ni luo he nu er) by Hou Hsiao-Hsien
 by Robert Van Ackeren
Distant Voices, Still Lives by Terence Davies
Ei by Danniel Danniel
The Heat Line (La Ligne de chaleur) by Hubert-Yves Rose
Herseye Ragmen by Orhan Oguz
Légendes Vivantes by Nodar Managadzé
Mars Froid by Igor Minayev
Natal da Portela by Paulo Cezar Saraceni
Noujoum A’nahar by Oussama Mohammad
Salaam Bombay! by Mira Nair
Summer Thefts (Sarikat Sayfeya) by Yousry Nasrallah
Soursweet by Mike Newell
Stormy Monday by Mike Figgis
The Story of Fausta (Romance Da Empregada) by Bruno Barreto
Tabataba by Raymond Rajaonarivelo
The Suitors by Ghasem Ebrahimian

Awards

Official awards
The following films and people received the 1988 Official selection awards:
Palme d'Or: Pelle erobreren by Bille August
Grand Prix: A World Apart by Chris Menges
Best Director: Fernando Solanas for Sur
Best Actress: Barbara Hershey, Jodhi May and Linda Mvusi for A World Apart
Best Actor: Forest Whitaker for Bird
Best Artistic Contribution: Peter Greenaway for Drowning by Numbers
Jury Prize: Krótki film o zabijaniu by Krzysztof Kieślowski
Golden Camera
Caméra d'Or: Salaam Bombay! by Mira Nair
Short films
Short Film Palme d'Or: Vykrutasy by Garri Bardin
 Short Film Prize for Animation: Traces of Sand (Ab Ovo / Homoknyomok) by Ferenc Cako
 Short Film Prize for Fiction: Physical Sculpture (Sculpture Physique) by Yann Piquer, Jean Marie Maddeddu

Independent awards
FIPRESCI Prizes
Krótki film o zabijaniu by Krzysztof Kieślowski (In competition)
Hôtel Terminus by Marcel Ophüls (Un Certain Regard)
Distant Voices, Still Lives by Terence Davies (Directors' Fortnight)
Commission Supérieure Technique
 Technical Grand Prize: Bird, for the quality of the soundtrack
Ecumenical Jury
 Prize of the Ecumenical Jury: A World Apart by Chris Menges
Ecumenical Jury – Special Mention: The Revolving Doors (Les Portes tournantes) by Francis Mankiewicz
Award of the Youth
Foreign Film: Herseye Ragmen by Orhan Oguz
French Film: Mon cher sujet by Anne-Marie Miéville
Other awards
Audience Award: Salaam Bombay! by Mira Nair

References

Media
INA: Opening of the 1988 Cannes Festival (commentary in French)
INA: List of winners of the 1988 festival (commentary in French)

External links

1988 Cannes Film Festival (web.archive)
Official website Retrospective 1988 
Cannes Film Festival Awards for 1988 at Internet Movie Database

Cannes Film Festival
Cannes Film Festival
Cannes Film Festival
Cannes